Jatidiri Stadium is a multi-use stadium in Semarang, Central Java, Indonesia. It is currently used mostly for football matches and is home stadium of PSIS Semarang. The stadium holds 25,000 people. In addition to a stadium, in this complex there is also a sports building, swimming pool, and other sports facilities. Jatidiri Stadium was built during the reign of Governor Muhammad Ismail and inaugurated in 1991. In 2016 the stadium renovation was started by the Central Java Provincial Government through Governor Ganjar Pranowo. The renovation of the stadium was completed at the end of 2021, the renovation consisted of drainage, fields, stands, roofs, and other supporting facilities which will later become an international class stadium.

Gallery

References

Sports venues in Indonesia
Football venues in Indonesia
Athletics (track and field) venues in Indonesia
Multi-purpose stadiums in Indonesia
Football venues in Central Java
Athletics (track and field) venues in Central Java
Multi-purpose stadiums in Central Java
Sports venues in Semarang
Buildings and structures in Semarang